Delia Reinhardt (born 27 August 1947) is a retired German diver. She competed in the 10 m platform at the 1964 Summer Olympics and finished in 10th place. She won a silver medal in the 3 m springboard at the 1966 European Aquatics Championships.

References

1947 births
Living people
Divers from Berlin
People from East Berlin
German female divers
Olympic divers of the United Team of Germany
Divers at the 1964 Summer Olympics
20th-century German women
21st-century German women